Walter Jordan (16 May 1904 – 27 June 1997) was an Australian rower. He was a three-time Australian national champion who competed in the men's eight event at the 1936 Summer Olympics.

Jordan rowed for the New South Wales Police club in Sydney. He first made state selection for New South Wales in the men's eight which contested and won the 1933 King's Cup. The following year he rowed in the 1934 New South Wales eight to another King's Cup victory. In 1935 along with three other Police rowers Jordan rowed in the New South Wales state eight which contested and won the 1935 King's Cup.  In 1936 the Police Club's eight dominated the Sydney racing season, the New South Wales state titles and won the Henley-on-Yarra event. They were selected in toto as Australia's men's eight to compete at the 1936 Berlin Olympics with their attendance funded by the NSW Police Federation.  The Australian eight with Jordan seated at six finished fourth in its heat, behind Hungary, Italy and Canada. It failed to qualify through the repechage to the final.

References

External links
 

1904 births
1997 deaths
Australian male rowers
Olympic rowers of Australia
Rowers at the 1936 Summer Olympics
Place of birth missing
People from Grafton, New South Wales
Sportsmen from New South Wales
20th-century Australian people